The 1981 Atlantic Coast Conference men's basketball tournament was held in Landover, Maryland, at the Capital Centre from March 5–7. North Carolina defeated Maryland, 61–60, to win the championship. Sam Perkins of North Carolina was named the tournament MVP.

Bracket

References

Tournament
ACC men's basketball tournament
College basketball tournaments in Maryland
Landover, Maryland
ACC men's basketball tournament
ACC men's basketball tournament